Isaac Heeney (born 5 May 1996) is a professional Australian rules footballer playing with the Sydney Swans in the Australian Football League.

Early life
Heeney was born in Maitland, New South Wales to mother Rochelle and father Adam. He grew up in the Hunter Region. He received  primary level education at Black Hill Public School in Black Hill. He then attended All Saints College. He began playing soccer at the age of 7 and managed to kick 68 goals in 12 games. Shortly after he picked up a cricket bat and played an age level above his own. He had a batting average of 216. He also travelled with his school to compete in a Sydney rugby league tournament and scored 5 tries in his team's grand final victory.

Heeney played his junior football for the Cardiff Hawks in the Black Diamond Australian Football League. A highly rated junior player, he joined the Sydney Swans' academy at the age of 12 years  before completing his education at Waverley College in Sydney while playing for the Swans Academy

Heeney later revealed he was the only student throughout his entire schooling that played Australian rules football and would have quit in favour of rugby league had the Swans' academy not existed. He grew up supporting the Swans and idolised Ryan O'Keefe as a child.

AFL career
Heeney was selected by the Swans in the 2014 AFL draft. His selection was controversial in that the Melbourne Football Club bid their first selection, number 2 overall, for Heeney but under drafting rules at the time, the Swans were able to match with their first selection, which was 18th overall. As a result of this, and the similar round based bidding process used for father–son rule selections, the draft criteria were changed to a points based system to provide for a more equitable outcome.

Heeney made his debut for Sydney at ANZ Stadium against Essendon in Round 1 of the 2015 season. He kicked his first AFL goal, which was also the match-winning goal and last in the match, late in the final quarter as the Swans came from 41 points down in the third quarter to win by 12 points. Following a 4-goal performance at the Sydney Cricket Ground in round 3, Heeney picked up an AFL Rising Star nomination as the Swans got off to an unbeaten start in the 2015 season. After a promising start to his season, Heeney suffered a knee injury in Round 6. He returned to the team in Round 17, kicking 2 goals and having an instant impact on the team. Heeney played out the remainder of the season, including in the team's finals games. He was named as the Sydney Swans' rising star after kicking 16 goals and averaging 12.6 disposals.

Heeney had a successful 2016 AFL season, playing every game except for rounds 16 and 17. Heeney set a new personal record for disposals in the opening round, collecting 23. He had a breakout game in Round 4, kicking 4 important goals and collecting 18 disposals, being named as one of Sydney's best on ground. He had one of the best games in his career in Round 7, where he kicked a bag of 5, his highest goal tally to that point. He received 3 Brownlow votes for his performance.

He had surgery soon after which kept him confined to a moon boot for a few weeks after the completion of the surgery. He also underwent stem cell treatment to help with the healing of his cartilage that had been removed during the operation.

Statistics
Updated to the end of the 2022 season.

|-
| 2015 ||  || 5
| 14 || 16 || 10 || 120 || 57 || 177 || 67 || 44 || 1.1 || 0.7 || 8.6 || 4.1 || 12.6 || 4.8 || 3.1 || 2
|- 
| 2016 ||  || 5
| 24 || 28 || 15 || 218 || 180 || 398 || 113 || 92 || 1.2 || 0.6 || 9.1 || 7.5 || 16.6 || 4.7 || 3.8 || 5
|-
| 2017 ||  || 5
| 20 || 16 || 13 || 250 || 161 || 411 || 100 || 95 || 0.8 || 0.7 || 12.5 || 8.1 || 20.6 || 5.0 || 4.8 || 4
|- 
| 2018 ||  || 5
| 22 || 19 || 14 || 248 || 200 || 448 || 99 || 111 || 0.9 || 0.6 || 11.3 || 9.1 || 20.4 || 4.5 || 5.0 || 7
|-
| 2019 ||  || 5
| 22 || 26 || 15 || 237 || 204 || 441 || 126 || 85 || 1.2 || 0.7 || 10.8 || 9.3 || 20.6 || 5.7 || 3.9 || 6
|- 
| 2020 ||  || 5
| 6 || 7 || 7 || 53 || 33 || 86 || 29 || 15 || 1.2 || 1.2 || 8.8 || 5.5 || 14.3 || 4.8 || 2.5 || 5
|-
| 2021 ||  || 5
| 21 || 36 || 21 || 222 || 111 || 333 || 119 || 41 || 1.7 || 1.0 || 10.5 || 5.2 || 15.8 || 5.6 || 1.9 || 8
|- 
| 2022 ||  || 5
| 25 || 49 || 28 || 251 || 159 || 410 || 117 || 118 || 2.0 || 1.1 || 10.0 || 6.4 || 16.4 || 4.7 || 4.7 || 7
|- class=sortbottom
! colspan=3 | Career
! 154 !! 197 !! 123 !! 1599 !! 1105 !! 2704 !! 770 !! 601 !! 1.3 !! 0.8 !! 10.4 !! 7.2 !! 17.6 !! 5.0 !! 3.9 !! 44
|}

Honours and achievements
Team
 McClelland Trophy: 2016

Individual
 All-Australian team: 2022
 2× 22under22 team: 2017, 2018
 AFL Mark of the Year: 2018
 AFLPA Best First Year Player: 2015
 AFLCA Best Young Player: 2016
 AFL Rising Star nominee: 2015 (round 3)

References

External links

 

1996 births
Sydney Swans players
Australian rules footballers from New South Wales
NSW/ACT Rams players
Living people
Sportspeople from Newcastle, New South Wales